Unni Løvlid (born 23 March 1976) is a Norwegian musician. She was raised in Hornindal, Sogn og Fjordane, where she was taught to play piano, fiddle, and Hardanger fiddle. Her interest in folk music was initiated by her mother, Oline Ragnhild Løvlid who taught her about the traditional music of Nordfjord.

Career 
After studying music at Firda gymnas, Unni went to the Toneheim folkehøyskole at Hamar. She continued her musical studies at the Norwegian Academy of Music. In 2007, she won the Gammleng-prisen in the folk music class.

Together with Sigrid Moldestad and Liv Merete Kroken, she started the stage and cabaret trio Fjøgl. They set up three performances in 2001–2004, among them they were of one of the draws at The international folklore festival in Forde 2001.

Discography

Solo albums 
Unni Løvlid Ensemble
1999: So ro liten tull (Personal Label)
2005: Vita (Heilo)
2008: Rite (Grappa)
2013: Lux (Heilo)

Collaborations 
2009: Seven Winds (Heilo), with Becaye Aw & Rolf-Erik Nystrøm

Compilations 
2009: Når Eg Står Her På Dei Høge Nutar, with various artists
2012: Nordic Woman (Heilo), with various artists

Unni Løvlid also appears on 
1997: Ingunn Linge Valdal og Knut Ivar Bøe: Ferdafolk
2000: Hornindalstausene: Frie former
2001: Norsk folkemusikk og folkedans
2002: Rusk
2002: Listen – The Art of Arne Nordheim
2005: Bridges: Live in China
2006: Rusk II
2006: Gjenklang
2006: Draumkvedet (Arne Nordheim)
2011: Beginner's Guide to Scandinavia

References

External links 
 

Norwegian folk musicians
Norwegian Academy of Music alumni
1976 births
People from Hornindal
Living people
Heilo Music artists